Murphy Island (also known as Donley Island) is a privately owned alluvial island in the Allegheny River in Gilpin Township, Armstrong County in the U.S. state of Pennsylvania. The island is situated across from South Buffalo Township.

The elevation of Murphy Island is 758 feet above sea level.

References

External links
U.S. Army Corps of Engineers navigation charts
Allegheny River Conservation Plan

River islands of Pennsylvania
Islands of the Allegheny River in Pennsylvania
Landforms of Armstrong County, Pennsylvania
Private islands of the United States